Timothy Todd McCord (born June 28, 1979) is an American musician. He is a member of the rock band Evanescence since 2006, playing bass until 2022 when he switched to guitar. Previously, McCord played guitar for the band The Revolution Smile from 2000 to 2004. McCord is also a member of the Japanese music label, Brave Wave Productions.

Equipment 
McCord uses Ernie Ball MusicMan StingRay basses, Ampeg SVT-4PRO amps and Ampeg 8x10 speaker cabinets.

Band projects 
The Bloody Swords – guitar (1997–2000)
The Revolution Smile – guitar (2000–2004)
Quitter – bass, keyboards (2001–2004)
The Snobs – guitar (2005–2008)
Evanescence – guitar (2022–present); bass (2006–2022)

Personal life 
McCord has two children with his wife, Danielle: Maddie and Declan. He also has three stepchildren, Alyssa (born December 29th, 2003, died February 9, 2020) Arianna  and Jeffrey.

References

External links 

Evanescence.com – Official website

Evanescence members
1979 births
American heavy metal bass guitarists
American male bass guitarists
American rock bass guitarists
Guitarists from California
Oakmont High School alumni
Living people
Alternative metal bass guitarists
21st-century American bass guitarists